The 1999 European Gymnastics Masters was the second edition of the European Gymnastics Masters tournament, the last one before the event changed its name to European Team Gymnastics Championships. The competition formed teams of athletes representing different nations, combining events from men's and women's artistic gymnastics, as well as rhythmic gymnastics. The event was held from June 19 to June 20 in Patras, Greece. The tournament was organized by the European Union of Gymnastics.

Medalists

See also
 1997 European Gymnastics Masters
 2001 European Team Gymnastics Championships
 2003 European Team Gymnastics Championships
 European Gymnastics Championships

References

European Team Gymnastics Championships
International gymnastics competitions hosted by Greece
1999 in Greek sport
1999 in gymnastics